Toluta'u Koula (born 6 July 1970) is a former Tongan sprinter who competed in the men's 100m competition at the 1996 Summer Olympics. He recorded a 10.71, not enough to qualify for the next round past the heats. He also competed in the 1992 Summer Olympics, scoring a 10.85, as well as the 2000 Summer Olympics, where he ran an 11.01. His personal best is 10.56, set in 1996. He also competed in the 1994 and 1998 Commonwealth Games.

Personal life
He is the father of Manly Warringah Sea Eagles back Toluta'u Koula Jr.

References

1970 births
Tongan male sprinters
Athletes (track and field) at the 1992 Summer Olympics
Athletes (track and field) at the 1996 Summer Olympics
Athletes (track and field) at the 2000 Summer Olympics
Olympic athletes of Tonga
Athletes (track and field) at the 1994 Commonwealth Games
Athletes (track and field) at the 1998 Commonwealth Games
Commonwealth Games competitors for Tonga
Living people